The Minneapolis–Saint Paul metropolitan area is the 16th-largest urban agglomeration in the United States, and is home to many corporations, companies, and divisions.  The core cities of Minneapolis and Saint Paul host many companies, but a majority are in suburban cities.

Economy
The Minneapolis–St. Paul metropolitan area is the country's 13th largest economy based on GDP and has surpassed the Detroit metropolitan area as the Midwest's second largest economy.

As of 2020, there are 24 Fortune 1000 companies headquartered in the Minneapolis–St. Paul metropolitan area. Six companies made Fortunes 2013 Global 500 list. There were also five Minneapolis-St. Paul-based companies listed on Forbes 2012 Largest Private Companies list, including Cargill, the largest privately held corporation.

Minneapolis

Saint Paul

Suburban headquarters

Arden Hills
 Land O'Lakes Inc.

Bayport
 Andersen Corporation (Forbes Private 500 #188)

Blaine 
 Aveda Corporation (subsidiary of Estée Lauder Companies)

Bloomington
 Bethany House
 Ceridian
 Dairy Queen - a unit of Berkshire Hathaway
 Donaldson Company
 Gander Outdoors (division of Camping World)
 Great Clips
 Holiday Companies (Forbes Private 500 #106)
 Josten's
 Pearson VUE
 Quality Bicycle Products (QBP)
 Salsa Cycles
 Surly Bikes
 SkyWater Technology
 Thermo King
 The Toro Company

Brooklyn Center
 Caribou Coffee
 Surly Brewing Company

Chanhassen
 Life Time Fitness

Eagan
 Blue Cross Blue Shield of Minnesota
 Sun Country Airlines
 Thomson Reuters

Eden Prairie
 Bluestem Brands Inc.
 C.H. Robinson Worldwide Inc.
 Lifetouch
 Home & Local Services
 Optum
 Phillips & Temro
 Supervalu (United States)

Edina
Admit One Home Systems
Minnesota Security
Coustic Glo International

Fridley
 Medtronic (operational headquarters)

Golden Valley
 Allianz Life
 General Mills
 Mortenson Construction
 Pentair United States headquarters
 Resideo

Hastings 
 Anytime Fitness

Inver Grove Heights
 CHS Inc. (Global 500 #259)

Little Canada
 St. Jude Medical Inc.

Maple Grove
 Great River Energy

Maplewood
 3M Company

Medina
 Polaris Industries Inc.

Mendota Heights
 Patterson Companies
 Patterson Dental

Minnetonka
 Carlson (Forbes Private 500 #91)
 Communication Systems Inc.
 Digi International
 Digital River
 Famous Dave's
 Polaroid Corporation
 UnitedHealth Group

New Brighton

 H. Brooks and Company

Oakdale
 Imation

Plymouth
 Christopher & Banks
 Protolabs

Richfield
 Best Buy

Roseville
 Old Dutch Foods
 Colder Products Company
 HED Cycling Products

St. Louis Park
 Coolibar / Coolibar Inc.
 Nordic Ware / Northland Aluminum Products
 nVent Electric United States headquarters
 Regis Corporation

Shakopee
 Canterbury Park

Shoreview
 Deluxe Corporation

Vadnais Heights
 H.B. Fuller

Wayzata
 Cargill (Forbes Private 500 #1)

Woodbury
 EcoWater, a unit of Berkshire Hathaway

See also
 :Category:Companies based in Minnesota (includes companies in the entire state)

Merged or defunct companies
Wells Fargo continues to have a major presence in Minneapolis, and the city is home to the Wells Fargo Home Mortgage division.  In 1998, Norwest Bank of Minneapolis bought Wells Fargo Bank of San Francisco, California. Because Wells Fargo had more brand recognition, Norwest chose to rename itself Wells Fargo Bank and moved its headquarters from Minneapolis to San Francisco.

Honeywell was headquartered in Minneapolis but moved to Morristown, New Jersey to occupy Allied Signal's headquarters after the two companies merged in 1999. Honeywell's former headquarters is now occupied by Wells Fargo.

The Soo Line Railroad is based in Minneapolis, but is owned by the Canadian Pacific Railway. The old company headquarters still exist as the Soo Line Building. The current headquarters is Canadian Pacific Plaza.

Northwestern Consolidated Milling Company produced Ceresota flour in Minneapolis from 1891 to 1953. Its Elevator A, and A and F mills are still standing and two of these structures are in use as office buildings.

ReliaStar Life Insurance Co. was bought by ING of the Netherlands but still maintains division headquarters in Minneapolis.

Dain Rauscher was bought by RBC of Canada but still maintains division headquarters in Minneapolis.

Burlington Northern was based in St. Paul until it merged with the Atchison, Topeka & Santa Fe Railway to form the BNSF Railway.  It is now based in Fort Worth, Texas.

The St. Paul Companies was the oldest company in Minnesota.  In 2004, they merged with Travelers and in 2009 they moved their headquarters to New York City.

In 2008, Northwest Airlines announced that it was merging with Delta Air Lines and moving its headquarters to Atlanta, Georgia.

In December 2010, ADC Telecommunications  was purchased by TE Connectivity.  By May 2011, they had moved the operations out of the Eden Prairie HQ of ADC to other facilities.  TE Connectivity continues to use ADC's Shakopee, MN facility.

Department 56, Inc. was headquartered in Eden Prairie, MN.  The maker of collectibles and giftware, notably Christmas Village buildings and Snowbabies, filed for bankruptcy in 2009 after purchasing Lenox from Brown & Foreman in 2005.  Department 56 was eventually acquired by Enesco and moved all operations except the artistic talent to Enesco's headquarters in Itasca, Illinois.

In 2001 Pillsbury Company was purchased by General Mills (also located in the Minneapolis-St. Paul area). Parts of Pillsbury were sold to International Multifoods Corporation which was later purchased by The J.M. Smucker Company of Orrville, Ohio, in 2004.

The Musicland Group, Inc. was an entertainment company which ran Musicland, Sam Goody, Suncoast Motion Picture Company, On Cue, and the Media PlaySuperstore Chains. The Musicland Group was purchased by Best Buy in 2001.

Control Data Corporation was a supercomputer firm which broke up into Control Data Systems and Control Data Corporation (CDC).  CDC currently operates as Ceridian.

Jasc Software was a software company in Eden Prairie which was founded by the creator of Paint Shop Pro.  It was acquired by Corel Corporation in 2004.

PepsiAmericas was merged into Pepsi Beverage Co. in 2009.

Lawson Software was an ERP software company based in St. Paul prior to being acquired by Infor.

Nash Finch merged with Spartan Stores to become SpartanNash and the headquarters was moved to Grand Rapids, Michigan.

References

.

Minneapolis
.Minneapolis-St. Paul
Economy of Minneapolis
Economy of Saint Paul, Minnesota